The Iron Claw or Iron Claw may refer to:

 The Iron Claw (1916 serial), a silent serial starring Pearl White
 The Iron Claw (1941 serial), a sound serial released by Columbia Pictures
 The Iron Claw (film), an upcoming biographical film
 Iron claw, a popular alternative name for the wrestling hold, the Clawhold
 Iron Claw (band), a Scottish rock band from the 1970s

See also
The Iron Clew, a mystery novel by Phoebe Atwood Taylor